Barbara Ercolano is an Italian astrophysicist known for her work on interstellar dust, star formation, and protoplanetary disks.

Ercolano is originally from Naples, and studied astrophysics at University College London. After postdoctoral research at University College London, the Center for Astrophysics  Harvard & Smithsonian, and the University of Cambridge, she became a lecturer in astrophysics at the University of Exeter. She moved to the University of Munich as a professor in 2010.

Ercolano is the 2010 winner of the Fowler Award in Astronomy of the Royal Astronomical Society.

References

External links
Home page

Year of birth missing (living people)
Living people
Italian astrophysicists
German astrophysicists
Women astrophysicists
Alumni of University College London
Academics of the University of Exeter